Trypanisma is a genus of moths in the family Gelechiidae.

Species
Trypanisma prudens (Clemens, 1860)

References

Gelechiini